Sir Ernest Willoughby Petter (26 May 1873 – 18 July 1954) was an English industrialist and unsuccessful politician.

Ernest and Percival Waddams Petter (1873–1955), were identical twins born on 26 May 1873 in High Street, Yeovil, Somerset, the third and fourth of the fifteen children of James Bazeley Petter, ironmonger and iron founder, of Yeovil, and his wife, Charlotte Waddams.

Ernest, along with his twin  Percy, had built the Petter Horseless Carriage in 1894, the first British car with an internal 
combustion engine. The vehicle  weighed 9 cwt (457 kg) including the 120 lb (55 kg) of the Petter engine with its flywheel and side bars.

In 1915, the Petters constructed the first British seaplane, the Short Type 184 to take part in a naval battle. Ernest Petter was chairman of the Petters Limited engineering company from which Westland Aircraft was separated in 1935.

Petter was knighted in 1925. He retired the following year. In 1938, he built The Fort, a large manor house in Comox Valley on the east coast of Vancouver Island, British Columbia, Canada.

His son William Edward Willoughby 'Teddy' Petter was an aircraft designer.

Political career 
Petter twice fought Bristol North: in 1918 as a National Party candidate and in 1923 as a Conservative, both times coming third.

He fought the 1931 Westminster St George's by-election as an Independent Conservative opposed to Stanley Baldwin's leadership of the Conservative Party.  Though he claimed to be free of party and running at the request of the electors, he was strongly backed by the Beaverbrook and Rothermere papers, including the Daily Express and Daily Mail. He was defeated by the official Conservative, Duff Cooper.

References 

1873 births
1954 deaths
People from Yeovil
Knights Bachelor
Conservative Party (UK) parliamentary candidates